Think Beyond The Label (TBTL) is a public-private partnership that delivers information, outreach and resources to businesses, job seekers and the public workforce system to ensure greater recruiting and hiring opportunities for job candidates with disabilities.

The organization's purpose is to inform, connect and communicate with all stakeholders in the disability and employment system to create a more inclusive workforce.  TBTL  offers a network and digital hub that provides access to qualified job candidates and public resources to enable employers to find and recruit the talent. TBTL offers a range of business-specific tools that build the case for hiring workers with disabilities. The organization also gives job seekers access a range of opportunities available to them, from public employment system resources to private sector job leads, including a jobs portal where job seekers can become part of a national pool of candidates actively being sought out by our network of businesses and the public workforce system.

References

Sources 
Using Humor in a Campaign Supporting Disabled People, The New York Times, January 28, 2010

Leveraging the Benefits of Hiring People with Disabilities, Evolved Employer, October 3, 2011

A New Push to Hire the Disabled, BloombergBusinessWeek, October 18, 2011

New Resource Calculates ROI of Hiring People with Disabilities, Society For Human Resource Management, October 20, 2011

New Federal Rule Proposed to Boost Employment of Individuals with Disabilities, Evolved Employer, January 26, 2012

Disability organizations based in the United States